Simondium is a hamlet 8 km south of Paarl in South Africa. It was named after Pierre Simond (1651-1713), Huguenot minister at the Cape.

References

External links

Populated places in the Drakenstein Local Municipality